Crematogaster californica is a species of ant in tribe Crematogastrini. It was described by Wheeler in 1919.

References

californica
Insects described in 1919